The Battle of Kaesong-Munsan (Hangul:; Hanja:) was a part of Operation Pokpoong, the offensive by the Democratic People's Republic of Korea that marked the beginning of the Korean War.

Order of battle

Democratic People's Republic of Korea 
 1st Infantry Division - Brigadier General Choe Kwang
 1st Infantry Regiment - Colonel Hwang Seok
 2nd Infantry Regiment - Colonel Kim Yang-choon
 3rd Infantry Regiment - Senior Colonel Lee Chang-kwon
 6th Infantry Division - Brigadier General Bang Ho-san
 13th Infantry Regiment - Colonel Kim Hoo-jin
 14th Infantry Regiment - Colonel Han Il-rae
 15th Infantry Regiment - Colonel Kim Hyun-ki

Republic of Korea 
 1st Infantry Division - Colonel Paik Sun-yup
 11th Infantry Regiment - Colonel Choe Kyung-rok
 12th Infantry Regiment - Lieutenant Colonel Kim Jeom-gon
 13th Infantry Regiment - Colonel Kim Ik-ryeol

Prelude 
Due to the reorganisation of the Republic of Korea Army, the quality of training of the ROK 1st Infantry Division was lower than that of other divisions. The 11th Infantry Regiment and the 12th Infantry Regiment just began battalion-sized training; only 2 battalions from the 13th Infantry Regiment were at the last phase of the training, and 1 battalion was sent away for the field training.

In addition, 57% of the soldiers were given leave on June 24. Under the circumstances, the 12th Infantry Regiment had to defend 80 km frontline with only 800 troops. Moreover, heavy firearms and vehicles were sent to the rear for reorganization, and the division commander Paik Sun-yup was absent at the scene for training since June 14.

References

Battles and operations of the Korean War in 1950
Battles of the Korean War involving North Korea 
Battles of the Korean War involving South Korea 
June 1950 events in Asia